Naval Air Station Rockaway adjoined Fort Tilden on the western portion of the Rockaway Peninsula in the New York City borough of Queens. It was established on transferred municipal property in 1917 during American involvement in World War I. 

The station was the departure point for the first transatlantic flight in 1919, executed by the crew of the NC-4. On November 27, 1918, the NC-1 took off from the station with 51 people aboard, establishing a new world record for persons carried in flight.

In 1920, U.S. Navy balloon A-5598 departed for the air station. It went off-course and its crew of three were recorded missing for several weeks, lost in the Canadian wilderness.

On August 31, 1921, an airship hangar caught fire. It destroyed the D-6 blimp along with two small dirigibles, the C-10 and the H-1 and the kite balloon A-P. The D-6 was built by the Naval Aircraft Factory, Philadelphia, Pennsylvania, to a design somewhat different from the other five D-class airships. It featured an improved control car (the "D-1 Enclosed Cabin Car) which had a watertight bottom for landings on water, and internal fuel tanks. 

The station was demolished in 1930 to make way for Jacob Riis Park.  Operations were moved across the inlet to a hangar in the municipal Floyd Bennett Field, which itself was sold to the federal government in 1941 and made Naval Air Station New York. In turn, NAS New York was decommissioned in 1972 and is now a part of the Gateway National Recreation Area, as are Fort Tilden and Jacob Riis Park.

References

External links
Welcome to the Rockaway Naval Air Station

Rockaway, Naval Air Station
Installations of the United States Navy in New York City
Rockaway, Queens
Rocka
Airports in Queens, New York
Closed installations of the United States Navy
Defunct airports in New York City